Euro English or European English, less commonly known as EU English, Continental English and EU Speak, is an alleged group of pidgin dialects of the English language as used in Europe, based on common mistranslations and the technical jargon of the European Union (EU) and the native languages of its non-native, English-speaking population. It is mostly used among EU staff, expatriates and migrants from EU countries, young international travellers (such as exchange students in the EU's Erasmus programme) and European diplomats with a lower proficiency in the language.

History 
The usage of the English language in Europe progressed through the 19th century, when the British Empire inherited colonies elsewhere in Europe such as Malta, Cyprus, Gibraltar, Menorca, Heligoland, and the Ionian Islands, the latter three in modern-day Spain, Germany, and Greece respectively. 

The term "Euro English" was first used by Carstensen in 1986 to denote the adoption of anglicisms in Europe.

The enlargement of the European Union over several decades gradually diminished the influence of two of the EU's working languages (German and French). The development of the Erasmus Programme created a new class of mobile Europeans who needed a lingua franca to communicate across Europe.

The question whether the appropriation of English by non-native speakers in Continental Europe is giving rise to a potential European variety of English has not yet been resolved. Mollin rejected Euro-English as a variety of English. According to Forche, many of the features suggested to be characteristic of Euro-English could be identified as learners' mistakes, although there are some nativisation tendencies.

Euro-English was heavily influenced and dominated by British English, due to the United Kingdom having been an EU member state between 1973 and 2020. However, the UK's withdrawal in early 2020 means that the EU's scope of native English dialects has been mostly reduced to the varieties of Hiberno-English spoken in the Republic of Ireland; one source believes that this will allow room for Romance languages to have more of an influence on Euro-English. There is also a possibility of a Romance language replacing English. Since the Exit of the United Kingdom from the European Union in 2020, the Government of France wants to encourage greater use of French as a working language.

Euro English in computers
The Unicode Common Locale Data Repository Project had drafted/defined "en-150" for English in Europe.

EU DGT style guide
The Directorate-General for Translation of the EU has a style guide for the English language to help write clear and readable, regular English. This guide is based on British English. It does not consider itself a guide for a distinct EU English that is different from real English, and merely mentions EU-specific terminology as a distinguishing feature. 

It prefers British English to American English, but recommends avoiding very colloquial British terms. This style guide defines the thousand separator as space or as a comma, and the plural of euro as euro.

Grammar

Conjugation 
Non-native English speakers frequently drop the third person singular suffix (-s). For example: he often call meetings.

Speakers of Euro English, in particular those from Eastern Europe, may use the progressive aspect with stative predicates, such as saying I'm coming from Spain instead of I come from Spain. This is typically not allowed in Standard English, but it is permissible in Euro English.

Deixis 

A construction that appears with very high frequency in European speakers of English is, for example, Euro English we were five people at the party, as opposed to Standard English there were five people at the party. Such constructions introduce a type of mandatory "clusivity" to the English language, in which the speaker always signifies whether they are a part of some bigger group.

Euro English also features slightly more frequent usage of the indefinite personal pronoun one, such as in one can protect one's country.

Inflection 

Register 

It is extremely frequent among European speakers of English to prefer the singular they in formal contexts, whereas native English speakers in the US and UK have historically considered it an informal colloquialism. This mirrors the usage of "singular plurals", in terms of levels of formality, in European languages, such as French , German , older Spanish , Danish and Norwegian , even though all of these examples are strictly used in the second person.

Vocabulary 

The English plural of the word euro was first defined as euro without a final s, before becoming euros with a final s.

See also
 African English
 English as a lingua franca
 Glossary of European Union concepts, acronyms, and jargon
 International English

References

Further reading 
 English in the European Union – Worlds of English (2/4), Open University

External links 
 Euro-English, English in the European Union. Teti Musmeci, Marina Foti
 The Allusionist podcast with Helen Zaltzman

1986 neologisms
British English
Dialects of English
Languages of Europe